Sanyasi-Samsari is a 1942 Indian Tamil-language film directed by M. Krishnaratnam. Sanyasi and Samsari are two separate films packaged into one and released together.

Plot 
Sanyasi
It is a story of a crook who is also a robber. He sets his eyes on a beautiful woman, Seetha who is Rajaram's wife. Rajaram seeks financial help from the crook to educate his son. The crook abducts Seetha but Seetha is saved by another woman. The rest of the story is how the problems are eventually solved.
Samsari
A native doctor is of the firm belief that Indian medicine is the best. He wants to get a groom to the elder of his two daughters, Gunavathi and Gowri. He wants the groom to be a good native physician. He finds one, Kulapathi, who is also qualified in western medicine. The native doctor's brother-in-law claims his right to marry Gunavathi. So the native doctor sets a condition saying whoever who finds the old system of medicine called Muppu can marry his daughter. The B-I-L steals the document from the native doctor but the younger daughter Gowri takes it back. How the problem is solved forms the rest of the story.

Cast 
Credits adapted from The Hindu.

Sanyasi
P. A. Kumar
P. G. Venkatesan
M. L. Pathi
C. S. D.Singh
Kottapuli Jayaram
P. S. Gnanam
P. R. Mangalam
T. S. Jaya
Loose Arumugam
Master Thangavel
M. V. Swaminathan
Kumari Selva

Samsari
Gavai Sathasivam
P. T. Ram
Puthukottai S. Rukmani
Vikatakavi Mariyappa
T. K. Ranjitham
K. Varalakshmi
K. Rajalakshmi
T. A. Rajeswari
M. Natanam
T. S. Lokanathan
P. S. B. Thondaiman

Production 
The film was produced by Jupiter Films, a company that was based in Pudukkottai. During the early decades it was a trend to package two or more films into one and release together. In 1939, five different comedy films were packaged into one and released under the title Sirikkadhe.

Soundtrack 
Sanyasi: Music was composed by M. S. GnanamSamsari: Music was composed by Nataraja Achari

Reception 
The films fared well at the box office and remembered for the "pleasing music and good acting by the veterans."

References 

Films about criminals
Films about physicians
Indian anthology films
Indian nonlinear narrative films
Indian black-and-white films
Animated anthology films